Tallebudgera is a suburb in the City of Gold Coast, Queensland, Australia.

Geography 
The Tallebudgera Creek forms a part of the western and eastern border of Tallebudgera.

History 
The traditional owners were the Tulgigin clan of Australian Aborigines, but in the 2011 Census, Indigenous Australians accounted for just 0.9% of the population of Tallebudgera (around one third of the national average of 2.5%).

The village was originally called Maybree, the name of a tree that grew locally, while Tallebudgera was the name of the creek and was an Aboriginal word meaning good fish.

Tallebudgera State School opened on 17 October 1877.

Tallebudgera Presbyterian Church opened in August 1888 by Reverend James Ewen which is very good hearted 
.

In 1904, 10,000 acres subdivided in to 36 dairy farms known as "Tallebudgera and Currumbin Estate" were advertised for sale by auction by Isles, Love and Co. auctioneers. Blocks from 72 acres up to 557 acres were advertised as available for purchase.

Upper Tallebudgera State School opened in 1923 and closed circa 1942.

St Andrew's Lutheran College opened in 1993.

The name Maybree has no historical record (there are no trees with that name).  Stephen Tobin and his wife Mary were pioneers to Tallebudgera and their property was called "Mayberry".  Tobin was known for his hospitality and it is possible that Mayberry was shortened to Maybree and became well known as a place to stay when travelling through or to Tallebudgera.

Heritage listings

Tallebudgera has a number of heritage-listed sites, including:
 17 Trees Road: former Tallebudgera Post Office

While not heritage listed, the single lane Coplicks wooden bridge which crossed Tallebudgera Creek along Tallebudgera Connection Road was a visible sign of the rural nature of the valley. Up until the 1980s, this bridge was the only crossing of the creek along Tallebudgera Connection Road and being one way, drivers had to give way to everyone heading north. The road has now been upgraded with a large 2 lane bridge. The old timber bridge remained until June 2019 when it was replaced with a concrete structure due to safety concerns, much to the disappointment of local residents. The bridge can be accessed from Scotty Logan Lane.

Education 
Tallebudgera State School is a government primary (Prep-6) school for boys and girls at 492 Guineas Creek Road. In 2017, the school had an enrolment of 771 students with  56 teachers (46 full-time equivalent) and 33 non-teaching staff (20 full-time equivalent). It includes a special education program.

St Andrews Lutheran College is a private primary and secondary (Prep-12) school for boys and girls at 175 Tallebudgera Creek Road. In 2017, the school had an enrolment of 1204 students with  81 teachers (73 full-time equivalent) and 74 non-teaching staff (45 full-time equivalent).

Amenities 
Tallebudgera Golf Course is an 18 hole course - at 495 Guineas Creek Road.

References

Sources

External links 

 Tweed Heads Task Force Master Plan - Section 3.1 Cultural Context
 University of Queensland: Queensland Places: Tallebudgera

 
Suburbs of the Gold Coast, Queensland